Allendale railway station  was the terminus of the single track branch of the Hexham and Allendale Railway, in north east England. The line connected villages in the area to the railway network via a junction at Hexham.

History

Built to carry freight, primarily the product of local lead mines, the line eventually opened to passengers. The passenger service was run by the North Eastern Railway who took over the line in July 1876. Passenger services were withdrawn in 1930 but freight services continued until 20 November 1950 when the line was abandoned.

Legacy

The station site and the first part of the track to Hexham were sold to the former station master. Today it is the location of the Allendale Caravan Park.

References

 Butt, R.V.J. (1995). The Directory of Railway Stations. Sparkford: Patrick Stephens Limited. .
 
Northumbrian Railways

Disused railway stations in Northumberland
Former North Eastern Railway (UK) stations
Railway stations in Great Britain opened in 1869
Railway stations in Great Britain closed in 1950
1869 establishments in England